Housebreaking (American English) or house-training (British English) is the process of training a domesticated animal that lives with its human owners in a house or other residence to excrete (urinate and defecate) outdoors, or in a designated indoor area (such as an absorbent pad or a litter box), rather than to follow its instinctive behaviour randomly inside the house. 

Around 840 million cats and dogs alone are owned as pets around the globe; and in the United States, seventy percent of households own a pet. The process requires patience and consistence from the human. Accidents are a part of the process, and if the pet's owner reacts negatively, it could be discouraged, and the success of the training might be delayed.

Dogs 
The first step in housebreaking a puppy is creating a routine or schedule. Young puppies are not able to control their bladder as well as older dogs, and they should be taken out frequently. A general rule of thumb is that puppies can hold their bladder one hour for every month of age bit if you would prefer to bring them out every half hour or hour you may be able to train very quickly but this is not necessary.  When taking the puppy outside, its owner should take it to a designated spot every time. Using a word as they excrete, such as "outside" or "bathroom," can be used as a way to remind the puppy what to do in the future once they are trained. Rewarding the puppy after they are done excreting helps the puppy to recognize that outdoors is the proper place to urinate and defecate. It is also important to note that older animals, dogs in particular, can require just as much training and attention as puppies whenever they are introduced to a new home. 

Crate training should be used when the human is not able to take the dog out within its scheduled time. The crate should be big enough for the puppy to be comfortable, but small enough for them to not want to excrete inside  the crate.

One important part of housebreaking a pet, and dogs in particular, is to have preparations in place for periods of one's absence. Many pet owners focus a lot of their energies into housebreaking their pet and then have the results of their efforts undone when they are away from their pet. If another person cares for a pet when its owner is away, and has been accustomed  to a particular place in the home as its toilet, its good toilet discipline is likely to last.

Cats 

Housebreaking a kitten is different from housebreaking a puppy. A kitten's toilet area would be a litter box inside the house, rather than a particular spot outside the house. A cat's instinct is to excrete within a substrate, and then to scratch and dig to hide the excretion. Litter boxes support this natural behavior. There are several varieties of substrate for litter boxes, but according to most veterinarians, cats prefer a scent-free clumping clay substrate. Litter boxes, too, are available in different sizes and design - small, big, with walls, with a lid - and choosing a suitable one is important. Where the litter box will be located also matters: it should be in a quiet area so that the kitten would not feel agitated by the setting of its toilet area. 

To introduce the kitten to its toilet area and acquaint it with the substrate, it should be placed in the prepared litter box. The kitten should be placed in the litter box again after it has eaten, as that is when its urge to excrete is the strongest. Most kittens take to litter boxes immediately if the substrate is to their liking. However, cats have different preferences, and some cats may prefer separate litter boxes for urine and feces.

While many people train their cat to use a litter box, cats can also be housebroken like a dog. However, this process requires more careful effort, and success depends also on the age of the cat.

See also
Crate training
Litter box

References

Dog training and behavior
Cats as pets
Urine
Feces